Léon Uhl (19 May 1889 in Paris – ? ) was a 20th-century French poet, playwright and opera librettist.

Works

Operettas 
1926: La Dernière valse, 5 May, three-act operetta, French adaptation of Der letzte Walzer on a music by Oscar Straus.
1927: La Teresina, 4 May
1928: La Rose de Stamboul, 26 January
1929: Une seule nuit, 9 March
1930: La Belle inconnue, 1 January
1932: Mariage à Hollywood, 2 March, operetta in 4 tableaux, French adaptation of Hochzeit in Hollywood on a music by Oscar Straus.
1935: Lady Poum, 23 February, French adaptation of Die Erte Beste
 Dante, in collaboration with Jean Sardou at the Grand Théâtre de Bordeaux.
 Jeanne de France, mystère lyrique in 4 acts and 8 tableaux, poem by Léon Uhl, music by Jean Nouguès (operas composer born in Bordeaux in 1875), Orléans, 5–8 May 1929, Gaîté Lyrique, 10 May 1931

Editions 
1950: La Dernière Valse, three-act operetta, libretto by Léon Uhl and Jean Marietti, music by Oscar Straus, M. Eschig
1937: La Prière sur le tombeau, preface by Léon Frapié, Chanth
1927: Un théâtre national en France. Paul Fort et les chroniques de France, Mercure de France, 15 September
1927: La Teresina, three-act operetta, music by Oscar Straus, M. Eschig

Theatre 

 Alceste au désert
 Le Mouchoir
 La Miniature
 Amoureuses
 L'Œillet rouge
 Le Sommeil de Racine, one-act play in verse, Revue française, 8 February 1925 ; Paris, Odéon, 22 December 1924
 La Parade de Tabarin
 Le Nid dans l'orage
 La Première Nuit de Don Juan
 Arlequin, rival de Don Juan, one-act play, Théâtre Athéna, 22 April 1931

Poetry 
1927: Odyl, with a présentation by Paul Fort, Eugène Figuière

Sources 
 Alphonse Marius Gossez, Les Poètes du XXe, Eugène Figuière, 1929, p. 253

External links 
 Cent ans de Mise en scène
 Léon Uhl on 
 Léon Uhl on ECMF (1918–1944

20th-century French poets
French opera librettists
Writers from Paris
1889 births
Year of death missing